Karina Chenelle LeBlanc  (born March 30, 1980) is an American-born Canadian former professional soccer goalkeeper and current general manager of the Portland Thorns FC. She played for the Canadian national team and multiple professional women's teams in the United States over her fourteen-year career.

Early life
LeBlanc was born in Atlanta, Georgia, to a Dominica father (from Portsmouth) and a Jamaican mother, Vans LeBlanc and Winsome LeBlanc, who had temporarily relocated to Atlanta to avoid the dangers of Hurricane David. LeBlanc grew up in Dominica until age eight when her family moved to Maple Ridge, British Columbia. LeBlanc began playing soccer at age 12 and was named one of the top 20 Division I recruits by USA Today in 1997, even though Maple Ridge Secondary School did not have a girls soccer team.  She was also an all-provincial basketball player and was voted British Columbia's Most Defensive Player in basketball in 1997.

University of Nebraska
LeBlanc attended the University of Nebraska and earned a degree in business administration. She played goalkeeper for the Nebraska Cornhuskers from 1997 to 2000 and became one of the school's most decorated goalkeepers in the history of the program. She was a finalist for the Hermann Trophy in 2000 and named to the 2001 Umbro Select All-Star Classic Women's Elite College Team. She was also a two-time All-Big 12 selection and was named an All-American.

Playing career

Club

Boston Breakers
LeBlanc played for Boston Breakers in the Women's United Soccer Association, the first women's professional soccer league in the United States.

Montreal Xtreme, New Jersey wildCat
In 2004, she played for the Montreal Xtreme of the W-League followed by the New Jersey Wildcats from 2005 to 2006.

Los Angeles Sol
In 2009, she was acquired in the first round (fifth overall) of the 2009 WPS General Draft by the Los Angeles Sol. She started and played in 19 regular-season matches for the team, saving 78 of 93 shots. LeBlanc was named to the 2009 WPS All-Star Team Starting XI.

Philadelphia Independence

In 2010, she was selected in the first round (second overall) of the 2010 Los Angeles Sol Dispersal Draft by the Philadelphia Independence.

magicJack
In August 2011, it was reported that LeBlanc had signed with magicJack and stepped in as goalkeeper after Hope Solo was sidelined with an injury.

Sky Blue FC
In December 2011, she was signed to the Sky Blue FC for the 2012 season; however, the WPS league folded before the season began.

Portland Thorns FC

On January 11, 2013, it was announced that LeBlanc was one of two Canadian national team members selected to join the Portland Thorns FC by way of weighted allocation. On January 13, 2014, Portland Thorns FC announced that LeBlanc had been traded to the Chicago Red Stars in exchange for the 2nd round draft pick in the 2015 NWSL College Draft.

Chicago Red Stars
LeBlanc finished her 2014 season with 76 saves and a goal against per game average of 1.0, in 21 matches; just behind league leaders Alyssa Naeher's 106 saves, and Hope Solo's .90 goal against average.

Because of participation in 2015 FIFA Women's World Cup LeBlanc played eight matches for Red Stars in 2015.
At the end of 2015 season, LeBlac called it a career and retired from professional soccer.
For her performance in her last professional match LeBlanc was named NWSL Player of the week of week 21.

International
LeBlanc represented Canada at five FIFA Women's World Cups, at the 2008 Olympics and at two Pan American Games, winning the gold medal with the national team at the 2011 Pan Am Games by stopping two penalty shots in the final. She made her one hundredth appearance for Canada in March 2012 and later that year was part of the Canadian team that won the bronze medal at the 2012 Summer Olympics. Prior to 2015 FIFA Women's World Cup, LeBlanc announced her retirement from international soccer at the end of the tournament.

Coaching career
LeBlanc served as an assistant coach at Rutgers University from 2005 to 2009. She has also served as a goalkeeper coach with the Canadian under-15 national team, and developed goalkeeping clinics throughout the United States and Canada.

Management career 
CONCACAF hired LeBlanc to be the head of women's soccer in July 2018. She left that position in 2021 to become general manager of the Portland Thorns FC. Her predecessor, Gavin Wilkinson, was removed because of the 2021 NWSL abuse scandal.

Honours 

Canada Soccer Hall of Fame (2022)
 She received the Order of Canada (2022) "for her contributions to the sport of soccer worldwide, and for her use of soccer as a tool for social change."

Personal life
LeBlanc was raised Roman Catholic but later became a Baptist while studying in college. LeBlanc married Jason Mathot in October 2016. On March 24 2020, she gave birth to their daughter, Paris.

See also
 List of Olympic medalists in football
 List of women's footballers with 100 or more international caps
 List of players who have appeared in multiple FIFA Women's World Cups
 List of 2012 Summer Olympics medal winners
 List of FIFA Women's World Cup broadcasters
 List of UNICEF Goodwill Ambassadors
 List of Canadian sports personalities
 List of Canada women's international soccer players
 List of 2011 Pan American Games medalists
 List of Los Angeles Sol players
 List of Chicago Red Stars players
 List of Philadelphia Independence players
 List of Portland Thorns FC players

References

External links

 
 
 / Canada Soccer Hall of Fame
 Chicago Red Stars player profile
 Portland Thorns FC player profile
 Los Angeles Sol player profile
 New Jersey Wildcats player profile
 Nebraska player profile

1980 births
Living people
Canada women's international soccer players
Black Canadian women's soccer players
Olympic soccer players of Canada
Footballers at the 2008 Summer Olympics
Footballers at the 2012 Summer Olympics
Nebraska Cornhuskers women's soccer players
Boston Breakers (WUSA) players
Los Angeles Sol players
Philadelphia Independence players
MagicJack (WPS) players
Expatriate women's soccer players in the United States
1999 FIFA Women's World Cup players
2003 FIFA Women's World Cup players
2007 FIFA Women's World Cup players
2011 FIFA Women's World Cup players
2015 FIFA Women's World Cup players
Footballers at the 2011 Pan American Games
USL W-League (1995–2015) players
FIFA Century Club
National Women's Soccer League players
Olympic medalists in football
Olympic bronze medalists for Canada
Portland Thorns FC players
Medalists at the 2012 Summer Olympics
Soccer players from Atlanta
Soccer people from British Columbia
People from Maple Ridge, British Columbia
Canadian people of Dominica descent
Canadian sportspeople of Jamaican descent
Dominica emigrants to Canada
Chicago Red Stars players
Pan American Games gold medalists for Canada
Pan American Games bronze medalists for Canada
Canadian expatriate sportspeople in the United States
Canadian soccer commentators
Women's association football goalkeepers
Canadian women's soccer players
Pan American Games medalists in football
New Jersey Wildcats players
Converts to Baptist denominations from Roman Catholicism
Canadian Baptists
Women's Professional Soccer commentators
Medalists at the 2011 Pan American Games
Women's Professional Soccer players
Members of the Order of Canada
Women's United Soccer Association players